The men's 120 yards hurdles at the 1962 British Empire and Commonwealth Games as part of the athletics programme was held at the Perry Lakes Stadium on Thursday 29 November 1962.

The top two runners in each of the three heats qualified for the final.

The event was won by Pakistan's Ghulam Raziq in 14.3 seconds, ahead of Australia's Dave Prince and Laurie Taitt from England who won bronze. This was Pakistan's only medal in the track and field program.

Uganda's Benson Ishiepai who won bronze in the 440 yards hurdles event, withdrew prior to the start of his heat.

Records

Heats

Heat 1

Heat 2

Heat 3

Final

References

Men's 120 yards hurdles
1962